Panic!, broadcast as No Warning! during its second season, is a half-hour American television anthology series.  Its 31 episodes aired on NBC from 1957 to 1958. The series host was Westbrook Van Voorhis.

Premise and production 
Each episode began with a person facing a sudden physical or emotional crisis.

Panic! was produced by McCadden Productions. Al Simon was the producer.

Schedule 
The 30-minute Panic! was broadcast at 8:30 p.m. Eastern Time on Tuesdays on NBC from March 5, 1957, through September 17, 1957. In June 1957 network executives commissioned 21 additional episodes. Repeats of previous episodes were shown until September 17, 1957, leaving the new episodes to be broadcast later. 

The first episode of No Warning! was broadcast on NBC on April 6, 1958, and the last episode was on September 7, 1958. Fourteen episodes were original, and nine were repeats of episodes of Panic!.

Guest stars 
Among notable guest stars were June Havoc, Darryl Hickman, Pamela Mason, James Mason, James Whitmore, Norman Leavitt, Trevor Bardette, William Kendis, Robert Vaughn, James Parnell, Barbara Billingsley, Paul Burke, William Fawcett, Clark Howat, Gary Hunley, Vivi Janiss, Ken Mayer, Chris Alcaide, Mercedes McCambridge, Ray Kellogg, Ann Rutherford, Dale Ishimoto, Robert Burton, Jess Kirkpatrick, Ray Teal, Paul Stader, Peggy Knudsen, Alan Dexter, Frank J. Scannell and Carolyn Jones.

Episodes 
In the 1957 episode "Marooned," James Mason, his wife Pamela and children Portland and Morgan portrayed a family trapped in a high rise building.

References

External links

Panic! (TV series) Episode list at CVTA

1950s American anthology television series
1957 American television series debuts
1958 American television series endings
NBC original programming
Black-and-white American television shows
Television series by Universal Television